Edward R. "Ted" Philips (born 1983) is an American politician who is the Representative for the 8th Norfolk District in the Massachusetts House of Representatives.

Early life, education, and career 
Philips was born in 1983 in Sharon, Massachusetts. Raised in Sharon, Philips graduated from Sharon High School in 2001. He studied political science at the University of Massachusetts Amherst, and received an MPA from the Sawyer School of Business at Suffolk University.

Upon graduating from the University of Massachusetts, Philips joined the Finance Committee for the town of Sharon. In 2006, he worked for State Senator Stephen Brewer. The following year, Philips joined State Representative Louis Kafka's office as a legislative aide. By 2020, Philips was staff director for Representative Kafka.

Massachusetts General Court 
In December 2019, Philips announced his intention to succeed his "mentor", retiring Representative Lou Kafka in the Massachusetts General Court. Along with Kafka, Philips received endorsements from 21 unions, as well as notable members of the Massachusetts General Court including Speaker Pro Tempore Patricia Haddad. His campaign focused on improving public transportation, elder care and economic development.

On Tuesday, September 1, 2020, Philips won the Democratic Primary in the 8th Norfolk District. He was unopposed in the general election on November 3, 2020, and was sworn in on January 6, 2021.

Electoral history

References 

Democratic Party members of the Massachusetts House of Representatives
21st-century American politicians
1983 births
Living people